Arthur Calder-Marshall (19 August 1908 – 17 April 1992) was an English novelist, essayist, critic, memoirist, and biographer.

Life and career
Calder-Marshall was born in El Misti, Woodcote Road, Wallington, Surrey, the son of Alice (Poole) and Arthur Grotjan Marshall (later Calder-Marshall; 1875 –1958), a civil engineer. The elder Arthur was grandson of the sculptor William Calder Marshall (1813–1894). William Calder Marshall's father William Marshall (1780–1859), D.L. (Edinburgh), a goldsmith (including to the King in the early nineteenth century) and jeweller, had married Annie, daughter of merchant William Calder, Lord Provost of Edinburgh 1810-11, by his wife Agnes, a daughter of landed gentleman Hugh Dalrymple. The Marshall family were Episcopalian goldsmiths from Perthshire; the Calder family were merchants.

In his youth, Calder-Marshall lived with his family in Steyning, where he made friends with Victor Neuberg, the poet and associate of Aleister Crowley. His 1951 memoir The Magic of My Youth includes extensive anecdotes re: Neuberg (nicknamed "Vickybird"), Crowley himself, and other Crowley associates such as Raoul Loveday and Betty May. 

A short, unhappy stint teaching English at Denstone College, Staffordshire, 1931–33, inspired his novel Dead Centre. In the 1930s, Calder-Marshall adopted strong left-wing views. He joined
the Communist Party of Great Britain and was also a member of the London-based left-wing Writers and Readers Group which also
included Randall Swingler, Sylvia Townsend Warner, Mulk Raj Anand, Maurice Richardson and 
Rose Macaulay.

In 1937, Calder-Marshall wrote scripts for MGM although none appears to have been filmed.

Calder-Marshall's fiction and non-fiction covered a wide range of subjects. He himself remarked, "I have never written two books on the same subject or with the same object."

In the 1960s, Calder-Marshall took on commissioned work which included a novelisation of the Dirk Bogarde film Victim. He has additionally been proposed as the author of The Adventures of James Bond Junior 003½ a children's novel about British spy James Bond's nephew, published under the pseudonym R. D. Mascott.

With his wife, documentary screenplay-writer Ara (born Violet Nancy Sales), he was the father of the actress Anna Calder-Marshall and the grandfather of the actor Tom Burke.

Media adaptations
Orson Welles adapted The Way to Santiago in 1941 for RKO. However Welles's troubles with the studio meant that no film got made.

James Mason purchased the film rights to Occasion of Glory, intending to make this project his directorial debut. Mason hired Christopher Isherwood to write the script.

Bibliography

Biography
"The Enthusiast; An Enquiry into the Life Beliefs and Character of the Rev. Joseph Leycester Lyne alias Fr. Ignatius, O.S.B., Abbot of Elm Hill, Norwich and Llanthony Wales" (1962, Faber and Faber; Facsimile reprint 2000, Llanerch Publishers, Felinfach)

Adult fiction
Novels:
Two of a Kind (1933)
About Levy (1933)
At Sea (1934)
Dead Centre (1935)
Pie in the Sky (1937)
The Way to Santiago (1940)
A Man Reprieved (1949)
Occasion of Glory (1955)
The Scarlet Boy  (1961)

Short fiction:
Crime Against Cania (1934)
A Pink Doll (1935)
A Date with a Duchess (1937)

Play:
Season of Goodwill (1965) (based on Every Third Thought by Dorothea Malm) 

As William Drummond:
Midnight Lace (1960) (novelisation)
Victim 1961 (novelisation)
Life for Ruth 1962 (novelisation)
Night Must Fall 1964 (novelisation)
Gaslight 1966 (novelisation)

Children's fiction
The Man from Devil's Island (1958)
The Fair to Middling (1959)

Adult non-fiction
Memoirs
The Magic of My Youth (1951)

Travel
Glory Dead (Trinidad) (1939)
The Watershed (Yugoslavia) (1947)

Miscellany
(With Edward J. H. O'Brien and J. Davenport) The Guest Book (1935 and 1936)
Challenge to Schools: A Pamphlet on Public School Education (1935)
The Changing Scene (essays on English society) (1937)
(With others) Writing in Revolt: Theory and Examples (1937)
The Book Front (1947)
No Earthly Command (biography of Alexander Riall Wadham Woods) (1957)
Havelock Ellis: A Biography (1959) US title The Sage of Sex: A Life of Havelock Ellis (1960)
The Enthusiast (biography of Joseph Leycester Lyne) (1962)
The Innocent Eye (biography of Robert Flaherty) (1963)
Wish You Were Here: The Art of Donald McGill (1966)
Lewd, Blasphemous, and Obscene: Being the Trials and Tribulations of Sundry Founding Fathers of Today's Alternative Societies (1972)
The Grand Century of the Lady (1976)
The Two Duchesses (1978)

Children's non-fiction
Lone Wolf: The Story of Jack London (1963)

Editor
Calder-Marshall edited and wrote the introduction to:
Tobias Smollett (1950)
The Bodley Head Jack London (four volumes: 1963–66)
Prepare to Shed Them Now: The Ballads of George R. Sims (1968)
Thomas Paine, The Rights of Man and Other Writings (1970)

References

Additional sources
The Reader's Companion to Twentieth-Century Writers, Frank Kermode, Peter Parker eds. (London: Fourth Estate, 1995), page 126
Contemporary Authors New Revision Series, volume 72, Gale.
St. James Guide to Horror, Ghost & Gothic Writers, David Pringle, (St. James Press, 1998)
Science Fiction and Fantasy Literature: Volume 2, R. Reginald, Douglas Menville, Mary A. Burgess (Wildside Press LLC, 2010), pp. 840–1

External links

Article about The Fair to Middling

1908 births
1992 deaths
20th-century British short story writers
20th-century English dramatists and playwrights
20th-century English memoirists
20th-century English novelists
20th-century English screenwriters
20th-century English male writers
20th-century biographers
20th-century essayists
Alumni of Hertford College, Oxford
English essayists
English biographers
People from Wallington, London
English male screenwriters
English critics
English male non-fiction writers
Calder Marshall family
Communist Party of Great Britain members
English children's writers